Connor Evans (né Salisbury) (born 27 September 2003) is a Welsh professional footballer who plays as a striker for Nantwich Town on loan from Crewe Alexandra.

Club career
Prior to a name change, Salisbury made his Crewe debut, aged 18, on 4 January 2022 in an EFL Trophy knockout game against Rotherham United F.C. as an 85th minute substitute for Regan Griffiths at Gresty Road, and subsequently made five substitute appearances in League games before the end of the season.

On 15 August 2022, Crewe announced that the striker had changed his surname to Evans in order to have the same surname as his mother and stepfather. Having signed his first professional contract earlier in the summer, Crewe said he would "be referred to as Connor Evans in all communications from this point".

On 7 October 2022, Evans joined Marine on an initial one-month loan which was later extended.

In February 2023, Evans joined Nantwich Town on loan until the end of the season.

International career
He played for the Wales under-18s in March 2021 against England.

Career statistics

References

2003 births
Living people
Welsh footballers
Association football defenders
Crewe Alexandra F.C. players
Marine F.C. players
Nantwich Town F.C. players
English Football League players
Northern Premier League players